The Miss Paraguay 2008 pageant was held in Asunción, Paraguay. The pageant was won by Gianinna Rufinelli, who was crowned by outgoing queen María José Maldonado. The pageant was broadcast live on Telefuturo from its main studio.

Results

Delegates

Judges
The following persons judged the final competition.
Lourdes Arévalos (Miss Universo Paraguay 2006)
Armando Rubin
Sussy Sacco
Marilyn Candia
Luis De León
José Espínola
Martha Avilés
Mariela Quiñónez
Liliana González Mena (Miss Universo Paraguay 1994)
Pamela Zarza (Miss Universo Paraguay 1992)

See also
Miss Paraguay

External links
Pictures of the delegates
Video: Crowing

2008
2008 beauty pageants
2008 in Paraguay
April 2008 events in South America